25 Years may refer to:

Music

Albums
 25 Years (Country Gentlemen album), 1980
 25 Years (Middle Class Rut EP), or the title song, 2009
 25 Years – The Chain, a box set by Fleetwood Mac, 1992
 25 Years, an album by Donnie Iris, 2004
 25 Years, a box set by Sting, 2011

Songs
 "25 Years" (song), by Hawkwind, 1978
 "25 Years", a song by Avail from Dixie, 1994
 "25 Years", a song by Blackmore's Night from The Village Lanterne, 2006
 "25 Years", a song by The Catch, 1983
 "25 Years", a song by Pantera from Far Beyond Driven, 1994

Television
 25 Years (TV programme), a 1985 New Zealand television special
 WWE Raw 25 Years, a 2018 special episode of WWE Raw

See also
 
 25 Años (disambiguation)